Bulgaria competed at the 2017 World Aquatics Championships in Budapest, Hungary from 14 July to 30 July.

High diving

Bulgaria qualified one male high diver.

Open water swimming

Bulgaria has entered one open water swimmer

Swimming

Bulgarian swimmers have achieved qualifying standards in the following events (up to a maximum of 2 swimmers in each event at the A-standard entry time, and 1 at the B-standard):

Synchronized swimming

Bulgaria's synchronized swimming team consisted of 2 athletes (2 female).

Women

References

Nations at the 2017 World Aquatics Championships
Bulgaria at the World Aquatics Championships
2017 in Bulgarian sport